"Hurting Each Other" is a song popularized by the Carpenters in 1972. It was written in 1965 by Gary Geld and Peter Udell, and has been recorded many times by artists ranging from Ruby & the Romantics to Rosemary Clooney.

Previous versions
The original version of the song was recorded by Jimmy Clanton and released in 1965 as a single on Mala Records.  According to Richard Carpenter, this version of "Hurting Each Other" had a very different feel from the Carpenters' product. However, there are definite similarities in the vocal refrain. Clanton's 1965 single of the song failed to chart.

Chad Allan & the Expressions, who later became The Guess Who, also recorded the song in 1965 on their Canadian LP Hey Ho (What You Do to Me!).  Released as a single, the song hit #19 on the Canadian charts in early 1966. In June 1966 a version by Ruth Lewis, produced by Udell and Geld, was released as a single by RCA Victor records. A version also appeared on The Walker Brothers' second album, Portrait, which was released in November 1966.

Ruby & the Romantics released the song as a single in 1969. The vocal arrangement is reflected in the Carpenters' version three years later.

Carpenters' version
The Carpenters recorded "Hurting Each Other" with instrumental backing from L.A. sessions musicians from the Wrecking Crew, towards the end of 1971. Some footage of Richard and Karen performing the backup vocals can be seen on Jerry Dunphy Visits the Carpenters, when news anchor Jerry Dunphy went to Karen and Richard Carpenter's house and interviewed them and their parents about their life.

It was released as a single in late 1971 from the album A Song for You. It reached number two on the Billboard Hot 100, it was kept from number one by Without You by Harry Nilsson "Hurting Each Other" also peaked at number one on the Easy Listening chart. Billboard ranked it as the No. 65 song for 1972.

The Carpenters performed "Hurting Each Other" at many live concerts, including a shortened version from the "Live in Osaka" concert in 1974.

Personnel
Karen Carpenter - lead and backing vocals
Richard Carpenter - backing vocals, piano, Wurlitzer electronic piano, orchestration
Joe Osborn - bass
Hal Blaine - drums
Gary Coleman - percussion

Chart performance

Weekly charts

Year-end charts

Post-Carpenters versions
In 1994, a version performed by Johnette Napolitano and Marc Moreland (of Concrete Blonde and Wall of Voodoo respectively) appeared on producer Matt Wallace's alternative rock tribute album of Carpenters covers, If I Were a Carpenter.

In 2020, The Avalanches sampled the Carpenters' chorus for their song, We Go On.

See also
List of number-one adult contemporary singles of 1972 (U.S.)

References

External links
 

1965 songs
1965 singles
1966 singles
1972 singles
Songs with music by Gary Geld
Songs with lyrics by Peter Udell
The Carpenters songs
Ruby & the Romantics songs
Jimmy Clanton songs
Rosemary Clooney songs
The Guess Who songs
The Walker Brothers songs
Andy Williams songs
A&M Records singles